The Vargas Era (Portuguese: Era Vargas) is the period in the history of Brazil between 1930 and 1945, when the country was governed by president Getúlio Vargas. The period from 1930 to 1937 is known as the Second Brazilian Republic, and the other part of Vargas Era, from 1937 until 1946 is known as the Third Brazilian Republic (or Estado Novo).

The Brazilian Revolution of 1930 marked the end of the First Brazilian Republic. President Washington Luís was deposed; the swearing-in of president-elect Júlio Prestes was blocked, on the grounds that the election had been rigged by his supporters; the 1891 Constitution was abrogated, the National Congress was dissolved and the provisional military junta ceded power to Vargas. Federal intervention in state governments increased and the political landscape was altered by suppressing the traditional oligarchies of São Paulo and Minas Gerais states.

The Vargas Era comprises three successive phases: 
the period of the Provisional Government (1930–1934), when Vargas governed by decree as Head of the Provisional Government instituted by the revolution, pending the adoption of a new Constitution.
the period of the Brazilian Constitution of 1934, when a new Constitution was drafted and approved by the Constituent Assembly of 1933–1934 and Vargas, elected by the Constituent Assembly under the transitional provisions of the Constitution, governed as President alongside a democratically elected legislature.
the Estado Novo period (1937–1945), instituted when, in order to perpetuate his rule, Vargas imposed a new, quasi-totalitarian Constitution in a coup d'état and shut down the Legislature, ruling Brazil as a dictator.

The deposition of Getúlio Vargas and his Estado Novo regime in 1945 and the subsequent re-democratization of Brazil with the adoption of a new Constitution in 1946 mark the end of the Vargas Era and the beginning of the period known as the Fourth Brazilian Republic.

Downfall of the First Republic
The tenente rebellions did not mark the revolutionary breakthrough for Brazil's bourgeois social reformers, but the ruling paulista coffee oligarchy could not withstand the economic meltdown of 1929.

Brazil's vulnerability to the Great Depression had its roots in the economy's heavy dependence on foreign markets and loans. Despite limited industrial development in São Paulo, the export of coffee and other agricultural products was still the mainstay of the economy.

Days after the U.S. stock market crash on 29 October 1929 (see Black Tuesday), coffee quotations immediately fell 30% to 60%. and continued to fall. Between 1929 and 1931, coffee prices fell from 22.5 cents per pound to 8 cents per pound. As world trade contracted, the coffee exporters suffered a vast drop in foreign exchange earnings.

The Great Depression possibly had a more dramatic effect on Brazil than on the United States. The collapse of Brazil's valorization (price support) program, a safety net in times of economic crisis, was strongly intertwined with the collapse of the central government, whose base of support resided in the landed oligarchy. The coffee planters had grown dangerously dependent on government valorization. For example, in the aftermath of the recession following World War I, the government was not short of the cash needed to bail out the coffee industry. But between 1929–30, world demand for Brazil's primary products had fallen far too drastically to maintain government revenues. By the end of 1930, Brazil's gold reserves had been depleted, pushing the exchange rate down to a new low. The program for warehoused coffee collapsed altogether.

The government of president Washington Luís faced a deepening balance-of-payments crisis and the coffee growers were stuck with an unsaleable harvest. Since power ultimately rested on a patronage system, wide-scale defections in the delicate balance of regional interests left the regime of Washington Luís vulnerable. Government policies designed to favor foreign interests further exacerbated the crisis, leaving the regime alienated from almost every segment of society.

Following the Wall Street panic, the government attempted to please foreign creditors by maintaining convertibility according to the money principles preached by the foreign bankers and economists who set the terms for Brazil's relations with the world economy, despite lacking any support from a single major sector in Brazilian society.

Despite capital flight, Washington Luís clung to a hard money policy, guaranteeing the convertibility of the Brazilian currency into gold or British sterling. Once the gold and sterling reserves were exhausted amid the collapse of the valorization program, the government was finally forced to suspend convertibility of the currency. Foreign credit had now evaporated.

Rise of Getúlio Vargas 
A populist governor of Brazil's southernmost Rio Grande do Sul state, Vargas was a cattle rancher with a doctorate in law and the 1930 presidential candidate of the Liberal Alliance. Vargas was a member of the gaucho-landed oligarchy and had risen through the system of patronage and clientelism, but had a fresh vision of how Brazilian politics could be shaped to support national development. He came from a region with a positivist and populist tradition, and was an economic nationalist who favored industrial development and liberal reforms. Vargas built up political networks, and was attuned to the interests of the rising urban classes. In his early years Vargas even relied on the support of the tenentes of the 1922 rebellion.

Vargas understood that with the breakdown of direct relations between workers and owners in the growing factories of Brazil, workers could become the basis for a new form of political power – populism. Using such insights, he gradually established such mastery over the Brazilian political world that, upon achieving power, he stayed in power for 15 years. During this time, as the stranglehold of the agricultural elites eased, new urban industrial leaders acquired more influence nationally, and the middle class began to show strength.

Aside from the Great Depression and the emergence of the Brazilian bourgeoisie, Brazil's historic dynamic of interregional politics was a significant factor encouraging the alliance that Getúlio Vargas forged during the Revolution of 1930 between the new urban sectors and the landowners hostile to the government in states other than São Paulo.

Along with the urban bourgeois groups, northeastern sugar barons were left with a legacy of longstanding grievances against the paulista coffee oligarchs of the south. Northeastern landowners opposed Washington Luís' 1930 discontinuance of the drought relief projects of his predecessor. The decay of established sugar oligarchies of the northeast had begun dramatically with the severe drought of 1877. The rapid growth of coffee-producing São Paulo state started at the same time. After the abolition of slavery in 1888, Brazil saw a mass exodus of emancipated slaves and other peasants from the northeast to the southeast of the country, thus ensuring a steady supply of cheap labor for the coffee planters.

Under the Old Republic, the politics of café com leite ("coffee with milk)" rested on the domination of the republic's politics by the southeastern states of São Paulo and Minas Gerais, which were Brazil's largest states in terms of population and economy.

Given the grievances with ruling regime in the northeast and Rio Grande do Sul, Getúlio Vargas chose João Pessoa of the northeastern state of Paraíba as his vice-presidential candidate in the 1930 presidential election. With the understanding that the dominance of the landowners in the rural areas was to continue under Liberal Alliance government, the Northeastern oligarchies were thus integrated into the Vargas alliance in a subordinate status via a new political party, the Social Democratic Party (PSD).

As a candidate in 1930, Vargas utilized populist rhetoric to promote middle class concerns, thus opposing the primacy (but not the legitimacy) of the paulista coffee oligarchy and the landed elites, who had little interest in protecting and promoting industry.

However, behind the façade of Vargas' populism lay the intricate nature of his coalition – ever-changing from this point onward. Consequently, these locally dominant regional groups – the gaúchos of Rio Grande do Sul and the sugar barons of the northeast – themselves ushered the new urban groups into the forefront of Brazilian political life in a revolution from above, tilting the balance of the central government in favor of the Liberal Alliance.

Second Brazilian Republic

Vargas' tenuous coalition lacked a coherent program, being committed to a broad vision of "modernization", but little else more definitive. Having to balance such conflicting ideological constituencies, regionalism, and economic interests in such a vast, diverse, and socio-economically varied nation would, thus, not only explain the sole constancy that marked Vargas' long career—abrupt shifts in alliances and ideologies, but also his eventual dictatorship, modeled surprisingly along the lines of European fascism, considering the liberal roots of his regime.

Between 1930–1934, Vargas followed a path of social reformism in attempt to reconcile radically diverging interests of his supporters. His policies can best be described collectively as approximating those of fascist Italy under Mussolini, with an increased reliance on populism. Reflecting the influence of the tenentes, he even advocated a program of social welfare and reform similar to New Deal in the United States, prompting U.S. President Franklin Roosevelt to proudly refer to him as "one of two people who invented the New Deal."

Vargas sought to bring Brazil out of the Great Depression through statist-interventionist policies. He satisfied the demands of the rapidly growing urban bourgeois groups, voiced by the new (to Brazil) mass-ideologies of populism and nationalism. Like Roosevelt, his first steps focused on economic stimulus, a program on which all factions could agree.

Favoring a state interventionist policy utilizing tax breaks, lowered duties, and import quotas to expand the domestic industrial base, Vargas linked his pro-middle class policies to nationalism, advocating heavy tariffs to "perfect our manufacturers to the point where it will become unpatriotic to feed or clothe ourselves with imported goods!"

Vargas sought to mediate disputes between labor and capital. For instance, the provisional president quelled a paulista female workers' strike by co-opting much of its platform and requiring their "factory commissions" to use government mediation in the future.

With the northeastern oligarchies now incorporated into the ruling coalition, the government focused on restructuring agriculture. To placate friendly agrarian oligarchs, the modernizing state not only left the impoverished domains of the rural oligarchs untouched, but also helped the sugar barons cement their control over rural Brazil. The peasantry, to the surprise of many accustomed to overlooking Brazil's peripheral regions, was not that servile. Banditry was common. Other forms included messianism, anarchic uprisings, and tax evasion, each of which was already common practice before 1930. The state crushed a wave of banditry in the northeast known as the cangaço, marking the reversal of the drastic but gradual decline of the northeastern latifundios from the 1870s to the 1930 revolution. At the expense of the indigent peasantry—85 percent of the workforce—not only did Vargas renege on his promises of land reforms, he denied agricultural workers in general the working class' gains in labor regulations. Likely to the detriment of that region's long-term economic development, Vargas' static conservatism on matters of the countryside arguably exacerbated the disparities between the impoverished, semi-feudal northeast and the dynamic, urbanized southeast to this day.

Opposition arose among the powerful paulista coffee oligarchs to these unprecedented mass interventionist policies, as well as to the increased centralization of the government, its increasing populist and fascist stance, its protectionist/mercantilist policies (protecting politically favored producers at the expense of consumers) and the increasing dictatorial stance of Vargas himself.

Appeasement of landed interests, traditionally the country's dominant forces, thus required a realignment of his coalition, forcing him to turn against its left wing. After mid-1932 the influence of the tenente group over Vargas rapidly waned, although individual tenentes of moderate tendency continued to hold important positions in the regime. With the ouster of the center-left tenentes from his coalition, his rightward shift would become increasingly pronounced by 1934.

Towards dictatorship

By 1934 Vargas developed what Thomas E. Skidmore and Peter H. Smith called "a legal hybrid" between the regimes of Mussolini's Italy and Salazar's Estado Novo in Portugal. Vargas copied fascist tactics, and shared their rejection of liberal capitalism. He abandoned the arrangements of the "provisional government" (1930–34) which were characterized by social reformism that appeared to favor the generally left wing of his revolutionary coalition, the tenentes.

A conservative insurgency in 1932 was the key turning point to the right. After the July 1932 Constitutionalist Revolution — a thinly-veiled attempt by the paulista coffee oligarchs to retake the central government — Vargas tried to recover support of the landed elites, including the coffee growers, in order to establish a new alliance of power.

The revolt was caused by Vargas' appointment of João Alberto, a center-left tenente as "interventor" (provisional governor) in place of the elected governor of São Paulo. The paulista elite loathed Alberto, resenting his centralization efforts and alarmed by his economic reforms, such as 5% wage increase and the minor distribution of some land to participants of the revolution. Amid threats of revolt, Vargas replaced João Alberto with a civilian from São Paulo, appointed a conservative paulista banker as his minister of finance, and announced a date for the holding of a constituent assembly. This only emboldened coffee oligarchs who launched a revolt in July 1932, which collapsed after three months of armed combat.

Regardless of the attempted revolution, Vargas was determined to maintain his alliance with the original farmer wing of his coalition and to strengthen his ties with the São Paulo establishment. The result was further concessions, alienating the left wings of his coalition. The essential compromise was failing to honor the promises of land reform made during the campaign of 1930. Vargas also pardoned half the bank debts of the coffee planters, who still had a significant grip on the state's electoral machinery, alleviating the crisis stemming from the collapse of the valorization program. To pacify his old paulista adversaries after their failed revolt, he ordered the Bank of Brazil to assume the war bonds issued by the rebel government.

Vargas was also increasingly threatened by pro-communist elements in labor critical of the rural latifundios by 1934, who sought an alliance with the country's peasant majority by backing land reform. Despite the populist rhetoric of the "father of the poor", the gaucho Vargas was ushered into power by planter oligarchies of peripheral regions amid a revolution from above, and was thus in no position to meet communist demands, had he desired to do so.

In 1934, armed with a new constitution drafted with extensive influence from European fascist models, Vargas began reining in even moderate trade unions and turning against the tenentes. His further concessions to the latifundios pushed him toward an alliance with the integralists, Brazil's mobilized fascist movement. Following the end of the provisional presidency, Vargas' regime between 1934 and 1945 was characterized by the co-optation of Brazilian unions through state-run, sham syndicates, and suppression of opposition, particularly leftist opposition.

Suppression of communist movement
Aside from these recent political disputes, long-term trends suggest an atmosphere in São Paulo conducive to ideological extremism. The rapidly changing and industrializing southeast, had been brewing an atmosphere conducive to the growth of European-style mass-movements; the Brazilian Communist Party was established in 1922 and the postwar period witnessed the rise of the country's first waves of general strikes waged by viable trade unions. The Great Depression intensified their strength.

The same Great Depression that had ushered Vargas into power also emboldened calls for social reforms. With the challenges of the Constitutionalist Revolt out of the way, and the looming mass-mobilization of a potential new enemy— the urban proletariat—Vargas grew more concerned with imposing a paternalistic tutelage over the working class, functioning to both control them and co-opt them. Vargas' backers in both urban and rural Brazil would begin to view labor, larger and better organized than directly after the First World War, as an ominous threat.

Vargas could unite with all sectors of the landed elites, however, to stem the communists. With the cangaço thoroughly repressed in the northeast, all segments of the elite - the new bourgeoisie and the landed oligarchs - shifted their well-founded fears toward the trade unionism and socialist sentiments of the burgeoning urban proletariat. The urban proletariat, often composed of immigrants, was from the more European (in terms of population, culture, ideology, and level of industrial development) and more urbanized southeast. In 1934, following the disintegration of Vargas' delicate alliance with labor, Brazil entered "one of the most agitated periods in its political history". According to Skidmore and Smith, Brazil's major cities began to resemble the Nazi-Communist battles in Berlin of 1932–33. By mid-1935 Brazilian politics had been drastically destabilized.

Vargas's attention focused on the rise of two nationally based and highly ideological European-style movements, both committed to European-style mass-mobilization: one pro-communist and the other pro-fascist—one linked to Moscow and the other to Rome and Berlin. The mass-movement intimidating Vargas was the Aliança Nacional Libertadora (ANL), a leftwing popular front launched in 1935 of socialists, communists, and other progressives led by the Communist Party and Luís Carlos Prestes, known as the "knight of hope" of the tenente rebellion (though not a Marxist at the time). A revolutionary forerunner of Che Guevara, Prestes led the futile Prestes Column through the rural Brazilian interior following his participation in the failed 1922 tenente rebellion against the coffee oligarchs. This experience, however, left Prestes, who only died in the 1990s, and some of his comrades skeptical of armed conflict for the rest of his life. Prestes' well-cultivated skepticism later helped precipitate the 1960s schism between hard-line militant Maoists and orthodox Marxist-Leninists which persists with the Brazilian Communist Party into the 21st century. With center-left tenentes out of the coalition and the left crushed, Vargas turned to the only mobilized base of support on the right, elated by the atrocious, fascist-style crackdown against the ANL. As his coalition moved to the right after 1934, Vargas' ideological character and association with a global ideological orbit remained ambiguous. Integralism, claiming a rapidly growing membership throughout Brazil by 1935, began filling this ideological void, especially among the approximately one million Brazilians of German descent.

Plínio Salgado, a writer and politician, founded Brazilian Integralist Action in October 1933. He adapted Fascist and Nazi symbolism and the Roman salute. It had all the visible elements of European fascism: a green-shirt-uniformed paramilitary organization, street demonstrations, and aggressive rhetoric directly financed in part by the Italian embassy. The integralists borrowed their propaganda campaigns directly from Nazi materials, including the usual traditionalist excoriations of Marxism and liberalism, and espousals of fanatical nationalism and "Christian virtues". In particular, they drew support from military officers, especially in the navy.

Economic development
The strong parallels between the political economy of Vargas and the European police states thus began to appear by 1934, when a new constitution was enacted with direct fascist influence. After 1934, fascist-style programs would serve two important aims: stimulating industrial growth (under the guise of nationalism and autarchy) and suppressing the working class. Passed on July 16, the Vargas government claimed that the corporatist provisions of the constitution of 1934 would unite all classes in mutual interests—the stated purpose of a similar governing document in Fascist Italy. Actually, this propaganda point had somewhat of a basis in reality. In practice, this meant decimating independent organized labor and attracting the "working class" to the corporative state. Of course, the advance of industry and urbanization enlarged and strengthened the ranks of urban laborers, presenting the need to draw them into some sort of alliance committed to the modernization of Brazil. Vargas, and later Juan Perón in neighboring Argentina, emulated Mussolini's strategy of consolidating power by means of mediating class disputes under the banner of nationalism.

The constitution established a new Chamber of Deputies that placed government authority over the private economy and established a system of corporatism aimed at industrialization and reducing foreign dependency. These provisions essentially designated corporate representatives according to class and profession, organizing industries into state syndicates, but generally maintained private ownership of Brazilian-owned businesses.

The 1934–37 constitution, and especially the Estado Novo afterwards, heightened efforts to centralize authority in Rio de Janeiro and drastically limit provincial autonomy in the traditionally devolved, sprawling nation. This was its more progressive role, seeking to consolidate the 1930 revolution, displacing the institutional power of the paulista coffee oligarchs with a centralist policy that respected local agro-exporting interests, but created the necessary urban economic base for the new urban sectors. The modernizing legacy is firmly evident: state government was to be rationalized and regularized, freed from the grips of coronelismo.

The constitution of 1934 thus established a more direct mechanism for the federal executive to control the economy, pursuing a policy of planning and direct investment for the creation of important industrial complexes. State and mixed public-private companies dominated heavy and infrastructure industries, and private Brazilian capital predominated in manufacturing. There was also a significant growth of direct foreign investment in the 1930s as foreign corporations sought to enlarge their share of the internal market and overcome tariff barriers and exchange problems by establishing branch plants in Brazil. The state thus emphasized the basic sectors of the economy, facing the difficult task of forging a viable capital base for future growth in the first place, including mining, oil, steel, electric power, and chemicals.

Third Brazilian Republic (Estado Novo)

Vargas' four-year term as President under the 1934 Constitution was due to expire in 1938, and he was barred from re-election. However, on 10 November 1937, Vargas made a national radio address denouncing the existence of a communist plot to overthrow the government, called the "Cohen Plan". In reality, however, the Cohen Plan was forged by the government with the objective of creating a favourable atmosphere for Vargas to stay in power, perpetuating his rule and assuming dictatorial powers.

The communists had indeed attempted to take over the Government in November 1935, in a botched coup attempt known as the Communist Uprising. In the wake of the failed communist uprising, the congress had already given greater powers to Vargas, and approved the creation of a "National Security Tribunal" (Tribunal de Segurança Nacional (TSN)), established by a statute adopted on 11 September 1936.

In his address of 10 November 1937, Vargas, invoking the supposed communist threat, decreed a state of emergency and dissolved the Legislature. He also announced the adoption by Presidential fiat of a new, severely authoritarian Constitution that effectively placed all governing power in his hands. The 1934 Constitution was thus abolished, and Vargas proclaimed the establishment of a "New State". The short interval was further evidence that the self-coup had been planned well in advance.

Under this dictatorial regime the powers of the National Security Tribunal were streamlined, and it focused on the prosecution of political dissenters. Also, the powers of the police were greatly enhanced, with the establishment of the "Department of Political and Social Order" (Departamento de Ordem Política e Social (DOPS)), a powerful political police and secret service. When created in 1936, the National Security Tribunal was supposed to be a temporary Court, and defendants could file appeals against its judgements to the "Superior Military Court" (Superior Tribunal Militar), Brazil's Court of Appeals for the Armed Forces, which was in turn subordinate to the nation's Supreme Court. Thus, communists and other defendants accused of plotting coups were judged by the military court-martial system (with the National Security Tribunal as the trial court of first instance for those cases), and not by the ordinary courts. With the advent of the Estado Novo regime, the National Security Tribunal became a permanent Court, and became autonomous from the rest of the Court system. It gained authority to adjudicate not only cases of communist conspirators and other coup plotters, but it also tried anyone accused of being subversive or dangerous to the Estado Novo regime. Also, several extrajudicial punishments were inflicted by the police itself (especially the DOPS), without trial.

The 1937 Constitution provided for elections to a new Congress, as well as a referendum to confirm Vargas' actions. However, neither were held — ostensibly due to the dangerous international situation. Instead, under an article of the Constitution that was supposed to be transitional pending new elections, the President assumed legislative as well as executive powers. For all intents and purposes, Vargas ruled for eight years under what amounted to martial law. Also, under the 1937 Constitution, Vargas should have remained President for only six more years (until November 1943), instead—again presumably due to the dangerous international situation—he remained in power until his overthrow in 1945.

The Estado Novo dictatorship also greatly curtailed the autonomy of the Judicial branch, and suppressed the autonomy of the Brazilian States, that were governed by federal interventors, who discharged (on a formally temporary basis), the legislative and executive powers.

In December 1937, one month after the Estado Novo coup, Vargas signed a Decree disbanding all political parties, including the fascist "Brazilian Integralist Action" (Ação Integralista Brasileira (AIB)). The integralists had until then been supportive of Vargas' anti-communist measures. On May 11, 1938, the integralists, angered by the closing of the AIB, invaded the Guanabara Palace, attempting to depose Vargas. This episode is known as Integralist Uprising and was unsuccessful.

Between 1937 and 1945, the duration of the Estado Novo, Vargas gave continuity to the formation of structure and professionalism in the State. Vargas oriented the state to intervene in the economy, promoting economic nationalism. The movement towards a "New State" was significant, in that along with the dismissal of Congress and its political parties, he wanted to recognize the indigenous population. He gained great favour in their eyes, and was called the "Father of the Poor". Besides gaining popularity with them, he provided them with tools to assist them in the improvement of their agrarian lifestyles. He felt that if the country were to progress that the Indians, the very symbol of Brazilianness, should reap the benefits, ridden the label of oppression the country. This was important to establish a unified society. The intention was to form a strong impulse toward industrialization.

In this period, a number of industrial bodies were created:
The "National Oil Advisor" (Conselho Nacional do Petróleo (CNP))
The "Administration Department of Public Service" (Departamento Administrativo do Serviço Público (DASP))
The "National Iron Smelting Company" (Companhia Siderúrgica Nacional (CSN))
The "Rio Doce Valley Company" (Companhia Vale do Rio Doce)
The "São Francisco Hydroelectric Company" (Companhia Hidro-Elétrica do São Francisco)
The "National Motor Plant" (Fábrica Nacional de Motores (FNM))

The Estado Novo had a powerful effect on "Modernist architecture in Brazil" (Arquitetura modernista no Brasil), because it provided sufficient authority to implement urban planning on a large scale in Brazil. Although sufficient wealth was not available to complete the plans, they had a powerful, lasting effect on the cities and their organization. One of the best-planned cities in the world, Curitiba, received its first planning during the Estado Novo. One notable urban planner was Alfred Agache.

A series of measures were used to restrain opposition, such as the nomination of Intervenors for the States and censorship of the media, performed by the "Department of Press and Propaganda" (Departamento de Imprensa e Propaganda (DIP)). This agency also promoted the ideology of the Estado Novo, designed the official propaganda of the government and tried to direct public opinion.

In 1943, Vargas promulgated the Consolidation of Labor Laws (CLT), guaranteeing that a job would be stable after ten years of service. It also provided weekly rest, regulated the work of minors and women, regulated night-time work and set a working day to eight hours.

Tensions with Argentina

The liberal revolution of 1930 overthrew the oligarchic coffee plantation owners and brought to power an urban middle class that and business interests that promoted industrialization and modernization.  Aggressive promotion of new industry turned around the economy by 1933.  Brazil's leaders in the 1920s and 1930s decided that Argentina's implicit foreign policy goal was to isolate Portuguese-speaking Brazil from Spanish-speaking neighbors, thus facilitating the expansion of Argentine economic and political influence in South America.  Even worse, was the fear that a more powerful Argentine Army would launch a surprise attack on the weaker Brazilian Army. To counter this threat, President Getúlio Vargas forged closer links with the United States. Meanwhile, Argentina moved in the opposite direction. During World War II, Brazil was a staunch ally of the United States and sent an expeditionary force to Europe. The United States provided over $370 million in Lend-Lease grants, in return for free rent on air bases used to transport American soldiers and supplies across the Atlantic, and naval bases for anti-submarine operations.  In sharp contrast, Argentina was officially neutral and at times favored Germany.

World War II

With the start of World War II, in 1939, Vargas maintained neutrality until 1941, when an agreement, proposed by Brazilian foreign relations minister Oswaldo Aranha, was formed between American continental nations to align with any American country in the event of an attack by an external power. Due to this agreement, from Pearl Harbor Brazil's entering the war became just a matter of time. American policy also financed Brazilian iron and steel extraction and placed military bases along the Brazilian North-Northeast coast, headquartered in Natal. With the conquest of Southeast Asia by Japanese troops, Getúlio signed a treaty, the Washington Accords, in 1942, which provisioned the supply of natural rubber from the Amazon to the Allies, resulting in the second rubber boom and the forced migration of many people from the drought-stricken northeast to the heart of Amazônia. These people were known as Soldados da Borracha ("rubber soldiers").

After the sinking of over 25 Brazilian merchant ships by German and Italian submarines throughout 1942, popular mobilization forced the Brazilian government to abandon its passiveness and declare war on Nazi Germany and Fascist Italy in August, 1942. Popular mobilization to make the war declaration effective, with the despatching of Brazilian troops to Europe, continued, but a decision by the Brazilian Government to actually send troops to fight the enemy was only made in January 1943, when Vargas and the U.S President Franklin Delano Roosevelt met in Natal, where the first official agreement was made to create an expeditionary force (BEF). In July 1944 the first BEF group was sent to fight in Italy, and, despite being poorly equipped and trained, it accomplished its main missions.

Soon after the war, however, fearing the BEF's popularity and possible political use of the allied victory by some BEF members, the then Brazilian government decided to make demobilization effective, with the BEF still in Italy. Returning to Brazil, its members were also subjected to some restrictions. Civilian veterans were forbidden from wearing military decorations or uniforms in public, while military vets were transferred to regions far from great cities or to border garrisons.

The events related to Brazilian participation in the war and the ending of the conflict in 1945 strengthened pressures in favour of redemocratisation. Although there were some concessions by the regime, such as the setting of a date for presidential elections, amnesty for political prisoners, the freedom to organize political parties, and a commitment to choose a new Constitutional convention, Vargas was not able to retain support for the continuation of his presidency and was deposed by the military in a surprise coup launched from his own War Ministry on October 29, 1945.

Once Vargas was deposed, the military summoned his legal deputy, José Linhares, the President of the Supreme Federal Court (Brazil's chief justice), to assume the Presidency (the office of Vice-President had been abolished, and no legislature had been elected under the 1937 Constitution, so that the President of the Supreme Court was the first person in the line of succession). José Linhares immediately summoned elections for President and for a Constituent Assembly. The elections were held in December, 1945, and José Linhares remained in office only until the inauguration of the Assembly and of the elected President (General Eurico Gaspar Dutra) which took place on January 31, 1946. The inauguration marked the end of the Estado Novo and the beginning of the Fourth Brazilian Republic.

See also 
Estado Novo (Portugal)
Brazilian Integralism

References

Bibliography
 in Portuguese

Brazil Now.Info Estado Novo.
Garfield, Seth. "The Roots of a Plant That Today Is Brazil: Indians and the Nation-State under the Brazilian Estado Novo" Journal of Latin American Studies Vol. 29, No. 3 (Oct., 1997), pp. 747–768

 
Modern history of Brazil
20th century in Brazil
1930 establishments in Brazil
1945 disestablishments in Brazil
Former countries of the interwar period